Pardosa agricola is a wolf spider species in the genus Pardosa found from Europe to Kazakhstan .

References

External links 

agricola
Spiders of Europe
Spiders of Central Asia
Spiders described in 1856